Thylacine were a three piece Australian rock band from the Northern Territory who were active during the 1990s. They released two albums through CAAMA music, Thylacine Live (1995) and Nightmare Dreaming (1997).

References

Northern Territory musical groups
Indigenous Australian musical groups